Rukawat Ke Liye Khed Hai is an Indian silent comedy/hidden camera reality television show which aired on SAB TV on 26 April 2015. It was hosted by Karan Singhmar.

Cast
 Raquib Arshad as Gym Guy

References

Sony SAB original programming
Indian drama television series
2015 Indian television series debuts
Indian reality television series
2015 Indian television series endings
Hidden camera television series
Indian comedy television series